Rolf Ramm Østgaard (15 January 1923 – 8 November 2014) was a Norwegian architect.

Personal life
Ramm Østgaard was born in Kristiania (now Oslo), Norway. He was the son of  Nikolai Ramm Østgaard  (1885-1958) and his wife  Ragni Gullichsen (1894-1956). His father was a military officer and  aide-de-camp for King Olav V of Norway. His mother served as lady-in-waiting to Princess Märtha of Sweden. He married Helene Bergland Ottesen in 1947.

Career
Ramm Østgaard graduated from the Norwegian Institute of Technology in 1947. He served as an apprentice to Swedish architect Hakon Ahlberg (1942–43) and as assistant to architect  Knut Bergersen in Trondheim (1946–47). He worked for Alvar Aalto (1947–1948) and for Erling Viksjø (1948–1952). He was employed at the Norwegian Directorate of Public Construction and Property (1952-1956). He established his own firm, Østgaard Arkitekter A/S (now Terje Grønmo Arkitekter A/S) in 1956.

His designs include the Norwegian Embassy in New Delhi (1960), the chemistry building at the University of Oslo (1968), the Norwegian Embassy in Beijing (1973), and the Norwegian Museum of Science and Technology in Oslo (1985). From 1968 to 1970 he served as president of the Association of Norwegian Architects.

References

1923 births
2014 deaths
Architects from Oslo
Norwegian Institute of Technology alumni